U of Z may refer to:

 University of Zagreb, a university in Croatia
 University of Zaragoza, alternatively known as Universidad de Zaragoza or Saragossa University, a university in Spain
 University of Zawia, a university in Libya
 University of Zimbabwe, a university in Zimbabwe

See also
 Uz (disambiguation)